Mark James Scott and Darren Scott, better known by their stage name SHY & D.R.S, are twin Scottish "songwriters" who have achieved Scottish music history securing 4 x Official chart hits independently within the genre of hiphop/pop.

Biography

Beginnings
Born in humble circumstances in Torry, Aberdeen the twin brothers Mark (SHY) and Darren (D.R.S) were discovered by Midge Ure and Virgin Records ex-head of A&R Ronnie Gurr in 2009, and pioneered Scottish Hip Hop.

They gained recognition when Keenan Cahill lip-synched their track "Relapse" on the Internet in 2011.

2011–2012: Signing and The Love Is Gone 
SHY & D.R.S were signed to Record label Guardian Angels Records, a record label distributed by Fontana Universal and Sony ATV, a record label run by Sandi Thom and Nick Yeatman until 2013, when the label terminated. The debut single featuring Sandi Thom charted in the Official Chart at number 32.  In an interview in October 2012, SHY & DRS revealed it was actually filmed in 2009 and the accompanying music video was based on the movie, Sin City.
The music video was premiered VEVO on September 12, 2012, and played on Music Television on 21 September 2012 The single made was included in Scottish Radio DJ Jim Gellatly's "Scotland's Greatest Album" in December 2012.

2012-2013: Relapse, I've Got (Enough Love) and Before Too Long 
In July 2013, SHY & D.R.S released their debut studio album, Before Too Long, which features guest vocals from multi-platinum Singer songwriter Sandi Thom, Rock legends Nazareth, Eminem's band D12 and Daniel de Bourg. The album entered into the Top 20 iTunes Hip hop Chart and remained there for six consecutive weeks.

In 2013, they released single "I've Got (Enough Love)" accompanied with a music video to VEVO which featured rock legends Nazareth. The single was covered by Classic Rock magazine. They were also featured on Keenan Cahill's first single "Closer" in November 2014 which was shared by the likes of Ryan Seacrest, Family Guy star Seth Green & Austin Mahone and has amassed over half a million views combined worldwide.

SHY & DRS' second single featuring BBC Introducing artist Luke Bingham was a re-release of their viral hit "Relapse" in April 2013, with the video performed and sung by Keenan Cahill, and the release of the SHY & DRS brand Energy Drink by Nae Danger. The song entered the Scottish Singles Chart at number 40.
Classic Rock magazine covered the collaboration

In August 2013, they released an animated music video onto VEVO which features rapper Bizarre from Eminem's multi-platinum selling band D-12
In July 2013 they released a charity track recorded with Northsound 1 Bauer radio presenters Greigsy & Aylissa which went straight into the Top 10 UK iTunes hip hop chart

2014 - present: Born Again
SHY & D.R.S featured on internet star Keenan Cahill's single "Closer" in 2014 which was premiered on Ryan Seacrest's Radio show and website. The song was performed live on German TV and American WGN-TV Channel

In February 2014, it was announced that they are leaving for the US with a new label deal with Sony and under new management

SHY & D.R.S formed their own independent label Unparallel Music Group and released "Born Again" with British trance singer Christina Novelli in August 2014. "Born Again" charted independently at number 26 in the Official Scottish Chart and at number 14 on the Music Week Indie Chart in its first week. The video was removed from YouTube for its controversial subject and scenes but was kept on VEVO. The video was later reissued on the YouTube Channel.

They performed "Born Again" and their first official Top 40 Single "The Love is Gone" live on BBC Radio Scotland's Culture Show and interviewed by Janice Forsyth who dubbed them "Scottish HipHop's Most Exciting Export" revealing they were touring with Eminem's Band D12 in 2015.

On 13 November 2015 they released the single "Beautiful to Me' featuring X-Factor's Janet Devlin. The song was the official single for the UK's National Anti-Bullying Week and charted at Number 25 on the official Scottish chart The song raised money for Childline UK and UK anti-bullying charity Ditch the Label.

Their 2015 video "What's Wrong With Us?" went viral achieving over 260,000 views in less than two weeks.

Business
The pair are sponsored by Nae Danger energy drink based in Glasgow, part owned by Duncan Bannatyne. In July 2013, Nae Danger released a "SHY & DRS" brand energy drink that features their image on the cans, giving a free download of their track "Relapse"

They said in a 2014 Interview that they were sponsored by German clothing label Goldside Blackforest, and in early 2015 that they were also sponsored by Scottish clothing label Marble Boy.

In early 2016 SHY & D.R.S announced a new sponsorship deal with UK clothing brand Fathersons Clothing and modelled  for the label.

Personal life 
Also known as Mark and Darren Scott, they grew up in Bridge of Don Aberdeen and attended Aberdeen University. Darren graduated in 2008 with a First Class Honours Degree in Sociology and Mark graduated with a master's degree in Psychology. They began rapping in American accents but later changed to using a classic Scottish accent.

Discography

Albums
 2006: The Unexpected
 2008: Behind Closed Doors 
 2013: Before Too Long

EPs
 2013: Read All About It EP

Singles

Featured in
2013: "Closer" with Keenan Cahill featuring SHY & DRS (also Closer (The Remixes) EP released in 2014)

Notes
"Closer" was released on November 15, 2013.

References

External links
 Vevo
Facebook
YouTube channel

1984 births
21st-century Scottish male singers
Scottish pop singers
Scottish male rappers
Living people
People from Hackney Central
NME Awards winners